La Provocation is a German-language drama film from 1970. It was directed by André Charpak, written by André Charpak and Jean Verdun, starring Jean Marais and Maria Schell.

Cast 
 Jean Marais as Christian
 Maria Schell as Jeanne
 Corinne Le Poulain as Isabelle
 Veit Relin as Bertrand
 André Charpak as André
 Evelyne Dassas as Françoise
 Gerald Robar

References

External links 
 
 La Provocation (1969) at Films de France
La Provocation (1969) at Uni France

1970 films
1970 crime drama films
French crime drama films
Israeli crime drama films
German crime drama films
West German films
1970s French-language films
French detective films
German detective films
Israeli detective films
1970s French films
1970s German films
French-language German films